Arab federation can mean:

 Arab Federation, a confederation between the Kingdom of Iraq and Jordan (1958)
 Arab League, a regional organization of Arab States in the Middle East and North Africa.
 Federation of Arab Republics, a federation between Libya, Egypt and Syria (1972-1977)
 United Arab Republic, a federation between Egypt and Syria (1958-61)
 United Arab States, a confederation between the Egypt, Syria and North Yemen (1958-61)
 Arab Islamic Republic, a proposed union of Libya and Tunisia (1974)
 United Arab Emirates, a union of seven Arab states (1971-present day)

See also
Federation of South Arabia, British protectorate (excluding Aden) which became independent as South Yemen (1962–1967)
Federation of Arab Emirates of the South, preceding the Federation of South Arabia (1959–1962)